Las Palmas is one of the forty subbarrios of Santurce, San Juan, Puerto Rico.

Demographics
In 2000, Las Palmas had a population of 2,772.

In 2010, Las Palmas had a population of 2,525 and a population density of 21,041.7 persons per square mile.

Description
It is home to the Las Casas Public Housing Project.

See also

 List of communities in Puerto Rico

References

Santurce, San Juan, Puerto Rico
Municipality of San Juan